Andover is a city in Anoka County, Minnesota, United States. The population was 32,601 at the 2020 census.

Geography
County Roads 9, 18, 78, and 116 are the main routes in the community. U.S. Highway 10 is nearby.

Crooked Lake is the only fully recreational lake in Andover. It is on the southern border of the city with the majority of the lake in neighboring Coon Rapids.

History
Andover first organized in 1857 as Round Lake Township.

In 1860 after an Anoka, Minnesota speech by U.S. Representative Galusha Aaron Grow from Pennsylvania who was an abolitionist and a major figure in the Homestead Act, the town name was changed to Grow Township.

Ham Lake Township split from Andover, known as Grow Township at the time, in 1871.

Once a stop on the Great Northern Railway, Andover was established as a city in 1976.

A popular myth surrounding the origins of the name "Andover" describe a train tipping of the railroad tracks, and an eyewitness describing that the train "went over and over", however this proves to be false because an Anoka County Union Newspaper article first mentions the name in an articled dated March 14, 1899, before any railroad tracks went through the city. The article described the Great Northern Railway announcing the names of new stations being located throughout the area, including a station named "Andover Station". The origin of the name for the station is unknown.

Demographics

2010 census
At the 2010 census there were 30,598 people, 9,811 households, and 8,357 families living in the city. The racial makeup of the city was 93.2% White, 1.7% African American, 0.3% Native American, 2.2% Asian, 0.6% from other races, and 1.9% from two or more races. Hispanic or Latino of any race were 2.0%.

Of the 9,811 households 47.6% had children under the age of 18 living with them, 74.2% were married couples living together, 7.1% had a female householder with no husband present, 3.9% had a male householder with no wife present, and 14.8% were non-families. 10.6% of households were one person and 3.4% were one person aged 65 or older. The average household size was 3.11 and the average family size was 3.35.

The median age was 37.3 years. 30.4% of residents were under the age of 18; 7.6% were between the ages of 18 and 24; 25.5% were from 25 to 44; 29.9% were from 45 to 64; and 6.7% were 65 or older. The gender makeup of the city was 50.7% male and 49.3% female.

2000 census
At the 2000 census, there were 26,588 people, 8,107 households, and 7,150 families living in the city. The racial makeup of the city was 96.48% White, 0.54% African American, 0.35% Native American, 1.08% Asian, 0.02% Pacific Islander, 0.32% from other races, and 1.21% from two or more races. Hispanic or Latino of any race were 1.05% of the population.

Of the 8,107 households 55.1% had children under the age of 18 living with them, 80.0% were married couples living together, 5.5% had a female householder with no husband present, and 11.8% were non-families. 8.4% of households were one person and 2.3% were one person aged 65 or older. The average household size was 3.28 and the average family size was 3.48.

The age distribution was 35.5% under the age of 18, 6.0% from 18 to 24, 36.4% from 25 to 44, 19.2% from 45 to 64, and 2.9% 65 or older. The median age was 32 years. For every 100 females, there were 103.4 males. For every 100 females age 18 and over, there were 102.5 males.

The median household income was $76,241 and the median family income was $78,785. Males had a median income of $50,248 versus $33,814 for females. The per capita income for the city was $26,317. About 1.2% of families and 2.0% of the population were below the poverty line, including 2.0% of those under age 18 and 4.0% of those age 65 or over.

City Celebration
The annual city celebration is the Andover Family Fun Fest, held near the beginning of July on and around the grounds of City Hall, Andover Elementary School, and Sunshine Park. Events include a 5K fun run, a street dance, a parade, and a fireworks show. 
 
The 25th Annual Andover Family Fun Fest was held on July 9 and 10, 2021.

Education
Andover is part of Minnesota's Anoka-Hennepin School District 11. District 11 schools within Andover's boundaries include Andover Elementary School, Crooked Lake Elementary School, Rum River Elementary School, Oak View Middle School, and Andover High School. In addition, a small strip of the northern part of the city is part of St. Francis Area Schools (Independent School District 15). Legacy Christian Academy is a K-12 college preparatory school.

Notable people
Mike Morin (born 1991), major league baseball pitcher
Maddie Rooney (born 1997), Olympic ice hockey goaltender

References

External links
City website

Cities in Anoka County, Minnesota
Cities in Minnesota
Populated places established in 1857
1857 establishments in Minnesota Territory